Pope Honorius IV (1285–1287) only created one new cardinal during his papacy.  This was accomplished on 22 December 1285:

 Giovanni Boccamazza, archbishop of Monreale and nephew of Pope Honorius – cardinal-bishop of Frascati, † 10 August 1309

External links

Honorius IV
College of Cardinals
Hon